The Nunes memo (formally titled Foreign Intelligence Surveillance Act Abuses at the Department of Justice and the Federal Bureau of Investigation) is a four-page memorandum written for U.S. Representative Devin Nunes by his staff and released to the public by the Republican-controlled committee on February 2, 2018. The memo alleges that the Federal Bureau of Investigation (FBI) "may have relied on politically motivated or questionable sources" to obtain a Foreign Intelligence Surveillance Act (FISA) warrant in October 2016 and in three subsequent renewals on Trump adviser Carter Page in the early phases of the FBI's investigation into Russian interference in the 2016 United States elections.

Nunes was the chairman of the House Intelligence Committee at the time and was a supporter of FISA surveillance extension. Former Trump campaign CEO and chief strategist Steve Bannon has described Nunes as Trump's second-strongest ally in Congress. In April 2017, Nunes stepped aside from chairing the House Intelligence Committee's Russia investigation while the House Ethics Committee conducted an inquiry into whether Nunes had violated applicable ethics rules with respect to his apparent secret coordination with White House officials. Nunes then began his own parallel secret investigation. The Ethics Committee investigation ended in December 2017, after which Nunes claimed that he had never recused himself.

Republican legislators who favored public release of the memo argued that the memo presents evidence that a group of politically-biased FBI employees abused the FISA warrant process for the purpose of undermining the Donald Trump presidency. These congressmen alleged that there was excessive and improper dependence on the Steele dossier, which was funded in part by the Clinton campaign and Democratic National Committee, when the Justice Department applied to the FISA court to conduct electronic surveillance on Trump aide Carter Page during the course of the campaign. Political allies of Donald Trump attempted to use the memo to pivot attention away from the Special Counsel investigation of the Trump presidential campaign's role in Russian interference in the 2016 United States elections.  Prior to release of the memo, news media  reported that Trump told his associates that release of the memo would discredit the investigation.

A social media campaign, under the hashtag #ReleaseTheMemo, emerged in mid-January 2018 to publicly release the memo despite some of its classified contents. Journalist and national security advocacy groups reported that Russian-linked bots on Twitter helped spread the controversial hashtag. Trump approved release of the Republican document over the objections of the FBI and the U.S. Intelligence Community. The FBI issued a rare statement expressing "grave concerns" about factual omissions and the accuracy of the memo. Within Congress, anticipation of the release of the memo sparked controversy, mainly along political lines. House Republicans released the memo on February 2, 2018.

Democrats on the House Intelligence Committee prepared a classified 10 page rebuttal of claims in the Nunes memo, which was initially blocked for release. After the Nunes memo was released to the public, the House Intelligence Committee voted unanimously to release the Democrats' memo. On February 9, Trump blocked release of the Democrats' memo, saying the committee should redact classified and sensitive material before releasing it to the public. A redacted version of the Democratic memo was ultimately released on February 24.

Contents
The memo states that a FISA warrant on Carter Page was sought and obtained on October 21, 2016, and that there were three subsequent 90-day renewals. The memo notes that FISA submissions are classified information.

The memo "raise[s] concern as to the legitimacy and legality" of the FISA application process relating to Page, and that probable cause was not made in the warrant application. It makes five main points. First it alleges that the Steele dossier "formed an essential part of the Carter Page FISA application". The memo asserted that Christopher Steele was paid $160,000 by the Democratic National Committee and the Clinton campaign. In fact, Perkins Coie, which represented the DNC and Clinton campaign, had no contact with Steele, and never paid him directly. Instead, they paid Fusion GPS $1.02 million in fees and expenses, $168,000 of which was paid to Orbis by Fusion GPS and used by them to produce the dossier. The DNC and Clinton campaign disclosed the total amount paid to Perkins Coie on campaign finance reports.

The memo also alleged that information about the payment was not disclosed in the initial October 2016 FISA application or subsequent renewals. However, the FBI's application for a FISA warrant did describe, in a footnote, the origins and political background of the dossier, a fact conceded by Nunes and other Republican leaders on February 5, after the memo's release.

Second, the memo alleges that the FISA application relied "extensively" on a Yahoo! News report from September 2016 by Michael Isikoff, which referenced  Page's July 2016 trip to Moscow and used information from Steele. It asserts that the article was "derived from information leaked by Steele himself to Yahoo News." Isikoff has stated that the information he got from Steele was actually information that the FBI already had. He also described Steele as serious and credible.

Third, the memo accuses Steele of being biased against the candidacy of Donald Trump, stating he was "desperate" and "passionate" that Trump would lose. It goes on to say Bruce Ohr knew about this bias and that it was not reflected in the FISA applications. Ohr however did not work on counter intelligence matters and had no role in obtaining the FISA warrants on Page.

The memo's fourth point quotes Bill Priestap saying that the corroboration of the Steele dossier was in its "infancy" in October 2016 during the FISA application. The memo further alleges that Andrew McCabe testified that "no surveillance warrant would have been sought from the Foreign Intelligence Surveillance Court (FISC) without the Steele dossier information." Other members of the House Intelligence Committee and sources close to the matter have stated that the Nunes memo "misquoted" and "mischaracterized" McCabe's testimony, which was given in private and has not been made public.

The memo also confirms that the spark for the FBI investigation into potential collusion between Trump's campaign and the Russians was not the Steele dossier, but rather the comments made by Trump adviser George Papadopoulos, who told an Australian diplomat in May 2016 that the Russians possessed "dirt" on Hillary Clinton in the form of hacked emails.  That confirmation contradicts earlier claims by some that the investigation had been triggered by the Steele dossier. The memo notes that Papadopoulos is mentioned in the Page FISA application, and says "there is no evidence of any cooperation or conspiracy between Page and Papadopoulos." It also says the FBI's Russia investigation was opened nearly three months before the FISA surveillance application in late July 2016 by Peter Strzok, who is accused of having "a clear bias against Trump and in favor of Clinton."

The memo also shows that the FISA warrant on Page was renewed three times. In each instance, the FBI had to show the signing judge that the warrant had merit. News accounts in 2017 indicated that because of the nature of his ties to Russia, Page had been under FBI scrutiny and had already been the subject of a FISA warrant in 2014, at least two years before the Trump campaign.

Finally, the memo asserts that former FBI Director James Comey testified to Congress that the Steele dossier was "salacious and unverified." However, Comey's prepared remarks show that he was referring specifically to "some personally sensitive aspects" of the dossier, not the entire dossier.

Background

The memo was produced by a small group of House Republicans and staff, led by Devin Nunes, as part of an investigation into how the FBI used the Steele dossier.  Democratic committee members were not informed about the investigation into the FBI or the preparation of the memo,  a possible violation of committee rules.  Adam Schiff, the ranking member of the House Intelligence Committee, said that Nunes had not read all of the relevant source material, although Nunes had argued for months that the FBI and DOJ had taken part in a conspiracy.

Nunes had previously recused himself from the committee's investigation into Russia's interference in U.S. elections due to a House ethics investigation into Nunes' coordination with the Trump administration. The House Ethics Committee stated that "Nunes may have made unauthorized disclosures of classified information, in violation of House Rules, law, regulations, or other standards of conduct" (the ethics investigation ended when the committee was unable to obtain the relevant classified information). However, after offering to step aside from the investigation into Russian interference, Nunes began his own "parallel" investigation, whose purpose appeared to be to undermine the original ongoing investigation.

Since January 18 a growing number of Republicans began calling for the release of the memo.

Adam Schiff released a statement and a letter to Nunes on January 31, 2018, stating that Nunes had "made material changes to the memo he sent to White House – changes not approved by the Committee" and that the White House was "reviewing a document the Committee has not approved for release." In response Peter King, who also sits on the Intelligence Committee, stated, "My understanding is this was agreed on beforehand among Republicans. There's one small part in the memo which in no way affects the substance in the memo." He said it involved removing only "three or four words" and came at the request of the FBI.

Social media influence

A social media campaign under the hashtag "#ReleaseTheMemo" emerged on January 19, 2018, to publicly release the memo despite some of its classified contents.

According to the Hamilton 68 project run by the bipartisan Alliance for Securing Democracy (ASD) which tracks Russian propaganda efforts on Twitter, the hashtag was promoted by Russian Twitter bot accounts, with a 230,000 percent spike in the promotion of the hashtag by these accounts. Clint Watts, one of the founding researchers of ASD, said the social media campaign started trending after Julian Assange advocated for the memo's release, which was then repeated by Russian influence networks. Twitter stated that a "preliminary analysis of available geographical data for tweets with the hashtag #ReleaseTheMemo ... has not identified any significant activity connected to Russia with respect to tweets posting original content to this hashtag."

Historical background

Carter Page originally came to the attention of the FBI counterintelligence unit in 2013, prior to his becoming a Trump campaign adviser, when the unit learned that Russian spies were trying to use Page as a source of information and to recruit him as an agent; this resulted in Page being interviewed by the FBI in June 2013. He was under secret intelligence surveillance beginning in 2014. Page claimed that the information he provided to the Russians was innocuous. Page was the subject of at least one FISA warrant, going back to 2014, when he was alleged to have been colluding with the Russian government or knowingly working as an agent on its behalf. In March 2016, then-candidate Donald Trump listed the little-known Page as one of his foreign policy advisers.

In a May 2016 meeting in London, Trump foreign policy adviser George Papadopoulos told the Australian High Commissioner to the United Kingdom, Alexander Downer, that the Russians possessed "dirt" on Hillary Clinton in the form of hacked emails. Two months later, Australian officials passed this information to American officials. This began the inquiry into Trump's relationship to Russia.

In July 2016, Page traveled to Moscow for five days, where he spoke at two meetings on July 7 & 8. Page had received permission from the Trump campaign to make the trip. On July 8, Page emailed Trump campaign officials about his presentation at the New Economic School in Moscow and described meeting Russian Deputy Prime Minister Arkady Dvorkovich. He said Dvorkovich "expressed strong support for Mr. Trump and a desire to work together toward devising better solutions in response to the vast range of current international problems." Page was later forced, under oath, to reveal he had met Dvorkovich during the visit.

The Steele dossier alleges that in July, Carter Page secretly met Rosneft chairman Igor Sechin in Moscow, together with a "senior Kremlin Internal Affairs official, DIVYEKIN"; that Sechin offered Trump a 19% stake in Rosneft (worth about $11 billion) in exchange for lifting the sanctions against Russia after his election, and that Page confirmed, on Trump's "full authority", that he intended to lift the sanctions.

In September, after reports surfaced about Page's July trip to Russia, the Trump campaign said Page was not part of the campaign and never had been. Page then said he was taking a leave of absence.

A month later, in October 2016, and after Page left the campaign, the FBI sought a FISA warrant to investigate his connections to Russia. The warrant was granted by a FISA court judge and has since been renewed thrice, with each 90-day extension requiring new evidence "pertinent to intelligence-related collection" in order to back up the original application and to show that the warrant continues to be productive.

Shortly after the release of the memo, Time magazine reported that in 2013, Carter Page bragged about being an "informal adviser to the Kremlin" in a letter to the editor. Page was asked about this admission on February 6, 2017, on ABC's Good Morning America program, and had trouble explaining how he reconciled his dual roles as Trump adviser and Kremlin adviser. Page also claimed that he, despite being named foreign policy adviser, had never actually met Trump, contradicting his earlier statements in which he said he had been in a "number of meetings" with Trump and had "learned a tremendous amount from him".

Purpose

Republicans posited that politically-motivated FBI employees attempted to undermine the Trump presidency, citing the Steele dossier, which they say was an essential part of the evidence used for obtaining a FISA warrant to wiretap Page. According to this argument, the FBI did not disclose to the FISA court that their request for a warrant depended on evidence in the Steele dossier, a document funded by the Hillary Clinton presidential campaign and the Democratic National Committee; according to this line of argument, Rod Rosenstein, Trump's Deputy Attorney General, knew of the funding from Democrats, and his approval of an application that failed to disclose that fact potentially implies that Rosenstein harbors some form of anti-Trump bias.

Fusion GPS, the firm behind the document, started its research into Trump with funding from the Paul Singer's conservative news outlet The Washington Free Beacon as part of the Never Trump movement. However, the news outlet stopped funding this research during May 2016 when Donald Trump became the presumptive nominee on May 3, 2016. Attorney Marc Elias then hired Fusion GPS on behalf of his clients, the Democratic National Committee and the 2016 Hillary Clinton presidential campaign, to continue this research and compile what would become the Steele dossier.

Responses

U.S. intelligence community

Shortly after becoming a trending topic, the memo drew polarizing reactions from government officials and the media, and generally along party lines for lawmakers. The Justice Department (DOJ) released a letter to Congress calling a release of the memo without review "reckless" because it could expose intelligence sources and methods. FBI Director Christopher Wray was allowed to read the memo and did so on January 28. On January 29, the majority of the House Intelligence Committee disregarded the DOJ's warnings and voted to approve the memo's release. In response, Democrats on the House Intelligence Committee drafted a ten-page rebuttal memo on January 24. Both memos were released to the full House. The Republicans voted against making public the competing memo Democrats had crafted, and rejected a proposal to give the Justice Department and FBI more time to vet the document. The President then had up to five days to review it before it could be officially released.

Republicans sought a committee vote that would request the release through the President, which would keep the memo confined to committee members until the President responded. The memo could be made public by a vote in the House of Representatives if the President did not act or denied the request, but no vote was scheduled for the full House.

Nunes and the House Intelligence Committee denied access to the memo by the Senate Intelligence Committee and the FBI, which expressed a desire to investigate any alleged wrongdoing. The Department of Justice sent a letter to Nunes and called the release of the memo "extraordinarily reckless." Nunes' panel refused to allow the FBI and the Justice Department to view the memo despite their requests.

Adam Schiff, ranking member of the House Intelligence Committee, issued a statement saying it was "[r]ife with factual inaccuracies" and was "meant only to give Republican House members a distorted view of the FBI." Schiff also said the memo omits key information on evidence other than Steele's dossier, used in the application for the FISA warrant.

On July 21, 2018, the Justice Department released a heavily redacted version of the October 2016 FISA warrant application for Carter Page, which stated in part "The FBI believes that Page has been collaborating and conspiring with the Russian government" and "the FBI believes that the Russian government's efforts are being coordinated with Page and perhaps other individuals associated with Candidate #1's campaign."

On December 9, 2019, Michael E. Horowitz, the Inspector General, released his report stating that the FBI found 17 “basic and fundamental” errors and omissions in its applications to the Foreign Intelligence Surveillance Court (FISA Court), but did not find political bias during the investigation of Trump and Russia, nor did he find evidence that the FBI attempted to place people inside the Trump campaign or report on the Trump campaign. However, in a Senate hearing, Horowitz stated he could not rule out political bias as a possible motivation. According to the Columbia Journalism Review, the Inspector General's report "confirmed" the "allegations of abuse by Nunes."

Trump administration
On January 24, 2018, Trump expressed support for releasing the Nunes memo. He reportedly told close advisers that he believed the memo would reveal the FBI's bias against him, and provide grounds for him to fire Rod Rosenstein. White House Counsel Don McGahn wrote that "the memorandum reflects the judgments of its congressional authors" and that the reason for its release was "significant public interest in the memorandum." After its release, Trump claimed in a tweet that the memo "totally vindicates" him.

Republicans
Before the memo was released, House Speaker Paul Ryan warned his fellow Republicans against overplaying the contents of the memo and tying it to the Mueller investigation. After the memo was released, Ryan said, "The matter of concern outlined in this memo is a specific, legitimate one. Our FISA system is critical to keeping America safe from real and evolving threats. It is a unique system with broad discretion and a real impact on Americans' civil liberties." Ryan also supported the release of the Democrats' counter-memo.

Representative Trey Gowdy said the FISA application cited other material besides the dossier, but in his opinion the warrant would not have been authorized without the dossier.

Democrats

Democratic leaders in Congress—House Minority Leader Nancy Pelosi and Senate Minority Leader Chuck Schumer—called upon House Speaker Paul Ryan to remove Nunes from the House Intelligence Committee, accusing him of abusing his 
position as committee chairman and of working in coordination with the White House that the committee is supposed to be investigating. Pelosi referred to the document as a "bogus" memo which was part of a Republican cover-up campaign; she also said Nunes had disgraced the House committee. Schumer said that the memo aimed to spread "conspiracy theories" and attacked federal law enforcement in order to protect Trump from investigation. Democratic House Whip Steny Hoyer also called for Nunes to be removed, saying Nunes' behavior had undermined the American people's trust in his chairmanship of the committee.

Jerry Nadler of New York, the ranking member of the House Judiciary Committee, issued a six-page analysis rebutting the memo's legal basis and accusing Republican House members of being part of "an organized effort to obstruct" Mueller's investigation. Nadler, who reviewed the classified material used to obtain the FISA warrant, called the memo "deliberately misleading and deeply wrong on the law." He argued the FISA Court had probable cause to believe Page was acting as "an agent of a foreign power."

Adam Schiff has stated that the "Nunes memo is designed to ... ["put the government on trial"] by furthering a conspiracy theory that a cabal of senior officials within the FBI and the Justice Department were so tainted by bias against President Donald Trump that they irredeemably poisoned the investigation."

Rebuttal memo 

Democrats on the House Intelligence Committee drafted a classified ten-page rebuttal memo on January 24. However, when the committee voted along partisan lines to release the Nunes memo, it also voted not to release the Democratic memo. On February 5 the committee voted unanimously to release the Democrat's minority memo, subject to Trump's approval. On February 9, Trump declined to release the rebuttal memo, with the White House suggesting sensitive sections be removed before the memo is made public. McGahn stated this was because of its "numerous properly classified and especially sensitive passages." After redactions in consultation with the FBI, the Democratic memo, titled Correcting the Record -- The Russia Investigation, was released on February 24. This rebuttal memo has also been referred to as the Schiff memo after Adam Schiff.

Criticism
Revelations about the Nunes memo and its surrounding controversy, including speculation about the potential firing of Mueller or Deputy Attorney General Rod Rosenstein, gave rise to comparisons to the Saturday night massacre, alluding to the firing of special prosecutor Archibald Cox by President Richard Nixon during the Watergate scandal.

Glenn Greenwald called the Republican-led campaign to release the memo "a bizarre spectacle" since the Republicans were "holding a document that only they can release, while pretending to be advocating for its release."

In response to the release of Nunes's document, former FBI director James Comey wrote, "That's it? Dishonest and misleading memo wrecked the House intel committee, destroyed trust with Intelligence Community, damaged relationship with FISA court, and inexcusably exposed classified investigation of an American citizen. For what?"

In an interview on Meet the Press, former CIA director John O. Brennan said that Nunes had presented only "one side, in a very selective, cherry-picked memo."  He said that for Nunes and the Republicans to deny the Democratic minority the ability to release their own memo "is just appalling, and it clearly underscores just how partisan Mr. Nunes has been." Brennan accused Nunes of an abuse of power in the use of his position on the House Intelligence Committee.  "I don't say that lightly," he added.

Three former CIA analysts (Jeff Asher, Nada Bakos and Cindy Otis) wrote that the "politically motivated, recklessly drafted" Nunes memo "does not support its main thesis" alleging abuse by the FBI and Department of Justice regarding their investigation of Carter Page as it "doesn't offer any evidence of the potential abuse and, in fact, the memo undermines itself".

Senator Sheldon Whitehouse has accused the authors of the memo of "using selective declassification as a tactic—they use declassified information to tell their side, and then the rebuttal is classified." Jane Mayer stated that this leaves Christopher Steele's defenders no possibility "to respond without breaching national-security secrets".

Paul Rosenzweig, former Assistant Secretary for International Affairs and former Whitewater investigator, has analyzed the Nunes memo and explained several reasons for why he believes "it makes no sense", is "not a serious effort at oversight", and "fails to make its case": the timing of the FISA warrant shows that any findings would first have come to light after the election and thus could not have affected it; Carter Page was no longer a member of the Trump campaign at the time of the application; it ignores that Page was under FISA surveillance as early as 2013 because of his proven Russian connections; the attempt to tie the October FISA application to Deputy Attorney General Rosenstein is flawed because Rosenstein was a U.S. attorney for the district of Maryland at the time and had nothing to do with that application; the memo "uses language that is intended to create a misimpression" by implying that the Steele dossier was central to the FISA application, when it was only a part of it; and that the memo "tries to bury" its "admission deep in the document", in the final paragraph, that the investigation into Russian interference in the 2016 United States elections was not triggered by the Steele dossier but by information from Trump advisor Papadopoulos.

Release of Carter Page FISA warrant applications

On July 21, 2018, the Justice Department released heavily redacted versions of four FISA warrant applications for Carter Page which showed that key assertions made in the Nunes memo were false or misleading, corroborating the rebuttal made by Democrats. The Nunes memo:

 Contended the application did not "disclose or reference the role of the DNC, Clinton campaign or any party/campaign in funding Steele's efforts, even though the political origins of the Steele dossier were then known to senior DOJ and FBI officials," an assertion Democrats disputed in their rebuttal. While the Nunes Memo was correct in that the DNC was not identified, the application provided a lengthy footnote that explained that the person who commissioned Steele was "likely looking for information to discredit" the Trump campaign. The application also explained that, despite the political motives of those who commissioned Steele, the FBI found Steele credible.
 Faulted the application for not identifying Hillary Clinton or the DNC by name. However, the application showed the standard practice of omitting the names of American individuals and organizations. For example, Trump and Clinton were identified only as "Candidate #1" and "Candidate #2," respectively.  While Hillary Clinton was identified as Candidate #2 in the application, it was not in reference to the dossier.
 Asserted the DOJ referenced a Yahoo News article as corroboration of Steele's information, even though it later became known that Steele had been a source for the article, an assertion rebutted by Democrats. However, the application actually cited the Yahoo News article only to show that Carter Page had denied allegations against him, under a section entitled "Page's Denial of Cooperation With the Russian Government."

The day after the applications were released, Trump asserted that they confirmed the Justice Department and FBI had misled the FISA court and as a result his campaign had been illegally spied on to benefit the Clinton campaign. Trump also quoted notable writer Andrew McCarthy, who had called into question the integrity of the FISA court itself.

See also
Dismissal of James Comey
Links between Trump associates and Russian officials
Trump Tower wiretapping allegations
Inspector General report on the Crossfire Hurricane investigation

References

External links

House Permanent Select Committee on Intelligence Memo (Nunes memo)
United States Foreign Intelligence Court Opinion April 2017
House Intelligence Committee Minority Response to the memo, from Democratic members of the House Intelligence Committee 
HPSCI Majority Response to Charges in the Democrats' Memo
Jerry Nadler's rebuttal letter to House Democrats
FBI statement on Nunes memo
Nunes statement on FBI and DOJ objection to memo's release

115th United States Congress
2018 controversies in the United States
2018 documents
2018 in American politics
Federal Bureau of Investigation operations
Memoranda
Russian interference in the 2016 United States elections
United States Foreign Intelligence Surveillance Court
United States House of Representatives
Works about security and surveillance